James Valentine Hogarth Milvain,  (February 14, 1904 – October 22, 1993) was a Canadian judge in the province of Alberta.

Born near Lundbreck, in what was then the Northwest Territories, he received his LL.B. from the University of Alberta in 1926. In 1927, he was called to the Alberta Bar. He was created a King's Counsel in 1944.

He was appointed judge of the Alberta Supreme Court in 1959 and Chief Justice in 1968. He retired at the mandatory age of 75 in 1979.

Honours
 In 1979, he received an honorary doctorate of law degree from the University of Alberta.
 In 1982, an elementary school was built with his namesake in the Calgary community of Whitehorn.
 In 1987, he was made an Officer of the Order of Canada.
 In 1989, he received an honorary doctorate of law degree from the University of Lethbridge.

References

External links
 James Valentine Hogarth Milvain fonds

1904 births
1993 deaths
Judges in Alberta
Officers of the Order of Canada
Canadian King's Counsel